Gracias a Dios ("Thanks to God", or "Thank God") is one of the 18 departments (departamentos) into which Honduras is divided. The departmental capital is Puerto Lempira; until 1975 it was Brus Laguna.

History
Once a part of the Mosquito Coast, it was formed in 1957 from all of Mosquitia territory and parts of Colón and Olancho departments, with the boundary running along 85° W from Cape Camarón south. The department is rather remote and inaccessible by land, although local airlines fly to the main cities.

Geography 
Gracias a Dios department covers a total surface area of 16,997 km² and, in 2015, had an estimated population of 94,450. 

Although it is the second largest department in the country, it is sparsely populated, and contains extensive pine savannas, swamps, and rainforests.  However, the expansion of the agricultural frontier is a perennial threat to the natural bounty of the department.

The department contains the Caratasca Lagoon, the largest lagoon in Honduras.

Demographics
At the time of the 2013 Honduras census, Gracias a Dios Department had a population of 90,795. Of these, 81.15% were Indigenous (79.70% Miskito, 0.95% Mayangna), 16.30% Mestizo, 1.58% Black or Afro-Honduran, 0.82% White and 0.15% others.

Crime 
Gracias a Dios is known to be a place of relatively high crime. Due to its remoteness and the Honduran government having a relatively low ability to fight crime, trafficking of narcotics is common in Gracias a Dios. Criminal organizations are also common in the area.

Municipalities

 Ahuas
 Brus Laguna
 Juan Francisco Bulnes
 Puerto Lempira
 Ramón Villeda Morales
 Wampusirpi

References

External links
U.S. Government Travel Advisory
U.S. Passports & International Travel

 
Departments of Honduras
States and territories established in 1957